Waldrausch is a 1977 West German drama film directed by Horst Hächler and starring Uschi Glas,  and Siegfried Rauch. A farmer tries to block the ambitious plans of an architect to build a new dam and flood a valley. It was based on the 1907 novel Waldrausch by Ludwig Ganghofer.

Main cast

References

Bibliography

External links

1977 films
1977 drama films
German drama films
West German films
1970s German-language films
Films based on works by Ludwig Ganghofer
Films based on German novels
Films set in Bavaria
Remakes of German films
Films set in the Alps
Films set in forests
Constantin Film films
Films directed by Horst Hächler
1970s German films